Coleophora mediodens is a moth of the family Coleophoridae. It is found in Mongolia.

References

mediodens
Moths described in 1976
Moths of Asia